Ellis Grove Precinct is located in Randolph County, Illinois, USA.  As of the 2010 census, its population was 953.

Geography

References

Precincts in Randolph County, Illinois